A special election for New York's 11th congressional district was held on May 5, 2015, to fill the vacancy created by the resignation of Michael Grimm. Grimm, a member of the Republican Party, announced on December 30, 2014, that he would resign from the House effective January 5, 2015, and not take his seat for a third term following his guilty plea for tax evasion. On May 5, 2015, Republican candidate Dan Donovan defeated his Democratic challenger Vincent Gentile in the election and filled the vacant seat.

Background
In April 2014, Grimm was indicted on twenty felony charges, including mail and wire fraud, perjury, obstruction of justice, employing illegal immigrants, and conspiring to defraud the United States after it was found that he under-reported revenues and employee wages relating to a restaurant he owned. He surrendered to the police and was released on $400,000 bail. Vowing his innocence, Grimm continued his campaign for reelection, and defeated Domenic Recchia, the Democratic Party nominee, by 53%, Grimm's highest margin in his congressional career.

On December 23, 2014, Grimm pleaded guilty to one charge of felony tax evasion. All other charges were dropped as part of the plea bargain. Grimm indicated that he would not resign his seat. However, on December 30, Grimm announced that he would resign from Congress on January 5, 2015, rather than be sworn in for his elected term. According to the U.S. Constitution (I.2.iv), Governor Andrew Cuomo is legally required to call a special election to fill the seat, which under the terms of the New York Constitution is to be held within 70 to 80 days of his announcement. On February 2, Cuomo, who had given no indication of when he would call the special election for, said that he was "looking at it now" but didn't have a timeframe for setting a date. Staten Island Attorney Ronald Castorina, Jr. filed a lawsuit on behalf of 8 Plaintiffs from Brooklyn and Staten Island, Republicans, Democrats, Independents, and Non-Enrolled parties, to force Cuomo to call a special election and on February 17, Judge Jack B. Weinstein of the United States District Court for the Eastern District of New York ordered Cuomo to either schedule the election or explain why he was delaying, or he would schedule the election himself. Cuomo's office replied that he would "announce the date" for the special election "shortly". On February 20, Cuomo announced that the election would be held on May 5.

As it was a special election, primary elections did not occur. The nominees were selected by local party leaders in Brooklyn and Staten Island .

Republican nomination

Candidates

Nominated
 Dan Donovan,  Staten Island District Attorney and  nominee for New York Attorney General in 2010

Declined
 Vito Fossella, former U.S. Representative
 Nicole Malliotakis, state assemblywoman

Democratic nomination

Candidates

Nominated
 Vincent J. Gentile, New York City Councilman

Not nominated
 Amber Adler, community advocate
 Lorie Honor, businesswoman
 Arne Mattsson, nominee for the 13th congressional district in 2002
 Carlo Scissura, president of the Brooklyn Chamber of Commerce
 John Sollazzo, vice chairman of the Staten Island Democratic Committee

Declined
 William Colton, state assemblyman
 Michael Cusick, state assemblyman
 Robert Holst, electrician and middle class advocate
 Michael McMahon, former U.S. Representative

Third parties
Besides the Democratic and Republican parties, the Conservative, Green, Independence, Reform, Women's Equality and Working Families parties are qualified New York parties. Under the terms of electoral fusion, a candidate may be nominated by multiple parties.

Conservative

Nominated
 Dan Donovan,  Staten Island District Attorney and Republican nominee for New York Attorney General in 2010

Declined
 Nicole Malliotakis, state assemblywoman
 James Molinaro, former Staten Island Borough President

Green

Nominated
 James Lane, Internet media professional and nominee for New York City Public Advocate in 2013 He is a member of the Adoptee Rights, Black Lives Matter and Stop Mass Incarceration movements. His current titles include: director of analytics & implementation, GroupM and editor-in-chief, Hot Indie News

Independence

Nominated
 Dan Donovan,  Staten Island District Attorney and Republican nominee for New York Attorney General in 2010

Not nominated
 Robert McKenna, retired New York City Police Lieutenant

Declined
 Nicole Malliotakis, state assemblywoman

Reform
 No nominee. Presumptive nominee Dan Donovan refused the line after pressure from the Conservative Party.

Working Families

Nominated
 Vincent J. Gentile, New York City Councilman

General election

Predictions

Polling

 * Poll commissioned by the Democratic Congressional Campaign Committee

Finance Reports

Results

County results

See also
List of special elections to the United States House of Representatives

References

External links
 Vincent Gentle for Congress
 Dan Donovan for Congress

United States House of Representatives 11
2015 11
New York 11
New York 2015 11
New York 11
United States House of Representatives 2015 11